Tongoenabiagus was the god of the Fonte do Ídolo (Portuguese for Fountain of the Idol), a 1st-century shrine in Braga (the Roman Bracara Augusta) with an inscribed fountain dedicated both to Tongoenabiagus and the goddess Nabia. His name may derive from the Celtic root *tenge(o)- (Old Irish tongu "I swear") and so he may have been associated with the swearing of oaths.

See also
Castro culture
Pre-Roman peoples of the Iberian Peninsula

References
 Coutinhas, José Manuel - Aproximação à identidade etno-cultural dos Callaici Bracari. Porto. 2006.
 García Fernández-Albalat, Blanca - Guerra y Religión en la Gallaecia y la Lusitania Antiguas. A Coruña. 1990.
 Olivares Pedreño, Juan Carlos - Los Dioses de la Hispania Céltica. Madrid. 2002.

External links
 Detailed map of the Pre-Roman Peoples of Iberia (around 200 BC)

Sea and river gods
Lusitanian gods